Toine Manders (born 14 March 1956) is a Dutch lawyer and politician who has been serving as Member of the European Parliament (MEP) since 1999. He served for the People's Party for Freedom and Democracy from 20 July 1999 until 17 October 2013 as part of the Alliance of Liberals and Democrats for Europe (ALDE). He left the People's Party for Freedom and Democracy to become the party leader for the 50PLUS party in the 2014 European Parliament election. After the 2019 European Parliament election, Manders joined the EPP Group. Since 2 June 2020 he is no longer representing the 50PLUS party, but the CDA party in the European Parliament.

Early life and education
Manders was born on 14 March 1956 in Stiphout. He attended the Academy for Industrial Design in Tilburg, graduating in 1982. He proceeded to study law Maastricht University, earning his degree in 1993.

Political career
Manders started his political career in the municipal council of Asten, of which he was a member between 1994 and 1999. He concurrently served as a member of the States-Provincial of North Brabant since 1995. In 1999 he resigned from both positions to run for the European Parliament.

Manders served for the People's Party for Freedom and Democracy in the European Parliament from 20 July 1999 until 17 October 2013 as part of the Alliance of Liberals and Democrats for Europe. He got enough preferences votes during each of the three elections to be chosen independent of his list position. He left the People's Party for Freedom and Democracy to become the party leader for the 50PLUS party in the 2014 European Parliament election, but the party didn't get enough votes for a seat. Manders felt that his former party had switched too much toward the political right, he also agreed that the People's Party for Freedom and Democracy's decision to limit their MEP terms to three might have influenced his decision. As Manders already served three terms he would not be eligible anymore. During the 2019 European Parliament elections in the Netherlands, he once again ran for the 50PLUS party. This time, he won a seat. On 2 June 2020, Manders left 50PLUS and joined the Christian Democratic Appeal party.

Since joining the European Parliament in 1999, Manders has served on the Committee on the Internal Market and Consumer Protection. In this capacity, he was the Parliament’s rapporteur on the Environmental Liability Directive (2004). In addition to his committee assignments, he is part of the Parliament’s delegation to the ACP–EU Joint Parliamentary Assembly.

In 2009, Manders rejected as "outrageous" an allegation by a Protestant group that the flag of Europe is a marian symbol, saying that similar symbols were also found in ancient Greece.

References

External links

 
 
 Biography at parlement.com

1956 births
Living people
20th-century Dutch lawyers
People from Helmond
Maastricht University alumni
Municipal councillors in North Brabant
Members of the Provincial Council of North Brabant
MEPs for the Netherlands 1999–2004
MEPs for the Netherlands 2004–2009
MEPs for the Netherlands 2009–2014
People's Party for Freedom and Democracy politicians
People's Party for Freedom and Democracy MEPs
50PLUS politicians
Articles containing video clips
MEPs for the Netherlands 2019–2024